Henry Bates is the name of:

 Henry Walter Bates (1825–1892), English naturalist and explorer
 Henry Bates (cricketer) (1880–1942), English cricketer
 Henry Bates (politician), American politician in the 1850s who was impeached
 Henry C. Bates (1843–1909), American lawyer and politician
 Henry Moore Bates (1869–1949), American lawyer and dean of the University of Michigan Law School
 Henry Bates (British Army officer) (1813–1893), British general
 Henry M. Bates (1808–1865), American banker and politician

See also
 Harry Bates (disambiguation)